Andreas Ioannides  (born November 29, 1975) is a Cypriot midfielder who played for Nea Salamina of Cyprus. He can play as defender.

External links

1975 births
Living people
Nea Salamis Famagusta FC players
Cypriot First Division players
Cypriot footballers
Association football midfielders